Pseudomecas is a genus of beetles in the family Cerambycidae, containing the following species:

 Pseudomecas elegantissima Martins & Galileo, 1998
 Pseudomecas femoralis Aurivillius, 1920
 Pseudomecas nigricornis Martins & Galileo, 1998
 Pseudomecas pallidicornis Aurivillius, 1923
 Pseudomecas pickeli (Melzer, 1930)
 Pseudomecas suturalis Martins & Galileo, 1985

References

Aerenicini